Stellan Skarsgård (born 13 June 1951) is a Swedish actor. He is known for his collaborations with director Lars von Trier appearing in Breaking the Waves (1996), Dancer in the Dark (2000), Dogville (2007), Melancholia (2011), and Nymphomaniac (2014). Skarsgård's early English-speaking film roles include The Unbearable Lightness of Being (1988), The Hunt for Red October (1990),  Good Will Hunting (1997), Ronin (1998), and King Arthur (2004). 

Skarsgård has since starred in various blockbusters such as Pirates of the Caribbean: Dead Man's Chest (2006) and Pirates of the Caribbean: At World's End (2007). He also starred in Mamma Mia! (2008), Angels and Demons (2009), David Fincher's thriller The Girl With the Dragon Tattoo (2011) and Dune (2021). Since 2011 he has appeared in the Marvel Cinematic Universe, portraying Dr. Erik Selvig in Thor (2011), The Avengers (2012), Thor: The Dark World (2013), Avengers: Age of Ultron (2015), and Thor: Love and Thunder (2022).

He is also known for his work in television portraying Boris Shcherbina in the HBO miniseries Chernobyl (2019) for which he received the Golden Globe Award for Best Supporting Actor – Series, Miniseries or Television Film and a nomination for the Primetime Emmy Award for Outstanding Supporting Actor in a Limited or Anthology Series or Movie. He stars in the Star Wars prequel series Andor (2022) on Disney+.

Early life 
Skarsgård was born in Gothenburg, the son of Gudrun (née Larsson; born 1930) and Jan Skarsgård (1920–1998). He moved often in his childhood and lived, amongst other places, in Helsingborg, Totebo, Kalmar, Marielund, and Uppsala.

Acting career 

Skarsgård started his acting career early; and, by the age of 21, his experience in film, TV and stage was considerable. Most of his early roles were in Swedish television (such as Bombi Bitt) and films. Of Skarsgård's work in Swedish film, he is perhaps best known for  Good Evening, Mr. Wallenberg, where he portrays Swedish diplomat Raoul Wallenberg, who worked to save Holocaust victims.

Skarsgård is particularly associated with director Lars von Trier and has appeared in six of the Danish auteur's features: The Kingdom, Breaking the Waves, Dancer in the Dark, Dogville, Melancholia, and Nymphomaniac. His most personal working relationship, however, is with Norwegian director Hans Petter Moland, who has directed the actor in Zero Kelvin, Aberdeen, In Order of Disappearance, and A Somewhat Gentle Man. Skarsgård considers Moland a close friend and, in 2009, he said of their relationship: "We're like an old married couple and I get separation anxiety." Another Scandinavian work that he is known for is the 1997 Norwegian film Insomnia, in which he plays the guilt-ridden policeman Jonas Engström.

Skarsgård's first American film was the 1985 film Noon Wine, directed by Michael Fields, in which Skarsgård played a mentally disturbed immigrant farmhand being chased by a bounty hunter. He acted opposite Fred Ward, who portrayed the farmer. In 1990, he starred in another American film, The Hunt for Red October, playing the character of Captain Tupolev, a Soviet submarine commander.

He was considered for the role of Oskar Schindler in Schindler's List. Skarsgård has said that people often mistook him for Liam Neeson, who portrayed Schindler in the film, and Skarsgård later replaced Neeson in the 2004 film Exorcist: The Beginning. He appeared as a guest star on Entourage as Verner Vollstedt, the German director of the fictional film Smokejumpers, who is hostile to the main character Vincent Chase. Skarsgård appeared as Bootstrap Bill Turner in both Pirates of the Caribbean: Dead Man's Chest and Pirates of the Caribbean: At World's End. In 2008, he starred as Bill Anderson in Universal Pictures' Mamma Mia! and reprised the role 10 years later in its sequel Mamma Mia! Here We Go Again.

Skarsgård played Dr. Erik Selvig in the 2011 film Thor, and later reprised the role in Thor: The Dark World (2013) and Thor: Love and Thunder (2022), as well as The Avengers (2012) and Avengers: Age of Ultron (2015). Skarsgård reteamed with Thor director Kenneth Branagh for the 2015 live-action adaptation of Disney's Cinderella, in which he played The Grand Duke. In 2021, he played Vladimir Harkonnen in Denis Villeneuve's Dune.

Skarsgård has appeared in music videos alongside fellow Swedes. He was in Eva Dahlgren's "Vem tänder stjärnorna" (Who Lights the Stars) in 1991 and Lykke Li's 2011 music video, "Sadness Is a Blessing".

Personal life 
He married My Skarsgård (born 1956), a physician, in April 1975; together they have six children: Alexander (born 1976), Gustaf (born 1980), Sam (born 1982), Bill (born 1990), Eija (born 1992), and Valter (born 1995). Alexander, Gustaf, Bill, and Valter are also actors, while Eija is a former model. Skarsgård and My divorced in May 2007. Stellan married Megan Everett in January 2009. The couple have two sons. Skarsgård has had a vasectomy, stating that he felt eight children was enough.

Views on religion 
Skarsgård was brought up by humanist, atheist parents, and had an atheist grandfather and a deeply religious grandmother. According to Skarsgård, this never led to any problems because of the family's mutual respect for each other's opinions. After the 11 September attacks, Skarsgård set out to read the Bible and the Quran, both of which he condemns as violent. Skarsgård is also a critic of religious independent schools in the Swedish educational system. He has said he considers the notion of God absurd and that if a real God were actually so vain as to constantly demand worship, then he would not be worthy of it.

In 2009, Skarsgård, along with other non-religious artists, authors, and entrepreneurs including Christer Sturmark, Björn Ulvaeus, and Christer Fuglesang, wrote an article in Dagens Nyheter stressing the importance of secularity. The group also criticised the UN for its stance on blasphemy laws.

Filmography

Film

Television

Awards and nominations

References

External links 

 
 

1951 births
20th-century Swedish male actors
21st-century Swedish male actors
Best Actor Guldbagge Award winners
Best Supporting Actor Golden Globe (television) winners
Best Supporting Actor Guldbagge Award winners
Critics of religions
European Film Awards winners (people)
Living people
Actors from Gothenburg
Secular humanists
Silver Bear for Best Actor winners
Skarsgård family
Swedish atheism activists
Swedish atheists
Swedish humanists
Swedish male film actors
Swedish male television actors